Caryonoda is a genus of leaf beetles in the subfamily Eumolpinae. It is considered either the only member of the tribe Caryonodini, or a member of the tribe Eumolpini. It contains six species from South America, and a single species from Nicaragua.

Species
The genus includes the following species:
 Caryonoda bisinuata Bechyné & Bechyné, 1961
 Caryonoda campanulicollis Bechyné, 1951
 Caryonoda funebris Gómez-Zurita & Maes, 2022
 Caryonoda kuscheli Bechyné, 1951
 Caryonoda meridana Bechyné, 1953
 Caryonoda pohli Bechyné, 1951
 Caryonoda tibialis (Lefèvre, 1885)

References

Eumolpinae
Chrysomelidae genera
Beetles of Central America
Beetles of South America